The Navigatori class were a group of Italian destroyers built in 1928–1929 for the  (Royal Italian Navy), named after Italian explorers. They fought in World War II. Just one vessel, Nicoloso Da Recco, survived the conflict.

Design
These ships were built for the Regia Marina as a reply to the large contre-torpilleurs of the Jaguar and  classes built for the French Navy. These ships were significantly larger than other contemporary Italian destroyers and were initially classed as esploratori or scouts. They were re-rated as destroyers in 1938.

The main armament was a new model /50 gun in three twin turrets which allowed for 45° elevation. The torpedo launchers consisted of two triple banks, each unusually comprising two  separated by one . Two rangefinder positions were provided; one above the bridge and one in the after superstructure.

Unit machinery was used comprising four boilers in two widely spaced boiler rooms and two turbine rooms. The forward unit drove the port shaft and the aft unit drove the starboard shaft.

The ships were fast, but were found to lack stability and were rebuilt with clipper bows, increased beam and reduced superstructure in the late 1930s.

During the war the torpedoes were replaced by triple 21-inch tubes and extra anti-aircraft guns were added.

Ships

Notes

Bibliography

 
 

 
 Shores, Cull & Malizia (1991). Malta: The Spitfire Year 1942. Grub Street.

Further reading

External links

 "Navigatori class" from Uboat.net

Destroyer classes